The Punjabi Saudagaran-e-Delhi, sometimes referred to as the Qaum-e-Punjabian (Urdu: قوم پنجابیان), Delhi Walay, Aldehlawi, or simply Shamsi Biradari are a community of Muslim Khatris that historically came from Sargodha in Punjab and then lived mainly in Old Delhi, India. They also settled in a number of other cities such as towns in western Uttar Pradesh, such as Agra, Aligarh, Meerut, Moradabad, Bareilly, Rampur, Kanpur; including areas within western Uttar Pradesh that now falls in the state of Uttarakhand; namely Nainital and Haldwani. After the partition of India, and subsequent independence of Pakistan in 1947, many members of the community migrated to Pakistan, particularly Karachi and Lahore, while few chose to migrate to Mecca and Medina.

History 
According to tradition, the clan belonged to the Muslim Khatris community, some of whom were converted to Islam by Shamsuddin Sabzwari. Some subgroups use the surname Shamsi (a disciple of Shams), in his honor. The families moved from either Sargodha, Bhera, Khushab, or Pind Dadan Khan in what is now Pakistan in the 17th century, in search of business opportunities to Uttar Pradesh and especially in Delhi on behalf of the Mughal Emperor Aurangzaib Alamgir. Other than in Delhi, important Qaum-e-Punjabian communities exist in Aligarh, Agra, Roorkee, Aonla, Hapur, Moradabad, Rampur, Kanpur and Kolkata.

The Qaum-e-Punjabian use Multani, Saudagar, or Shamsi as their surname. They are an endogamous community, practicing both cross-cousin and parallel-cousin marriages.

Historically, the Qaum-e-Punjabian played an important role in India's trans-regional trade.

Quam-e-Punjabian Aonla 
The Quam-e-Punjabian Aonla, is a separate sub-group of the Punjabi Saudagars.  They are said to have settled in the town of Aonla in Rohilkhand in the early 17th Century. The Aonla Punjabi Saudagar are now found scattered all over Rohilkhand, in particular, the city of Bareilly, where the settlement of Saudagar Tola is particularly ancient. In spite of their common ethnic origin with Qaum -e -Punjabian Delhi, they form a distinct community, with their own communal organizations.  A significant number have immigrated to Kolkata and Mumbai. Their main Biradaris are the Soleja, Mahindarata, Chhabra, and Khera. A much smaller number have also settled in Karachi.

Notable individuals 
Imran Ismail, Pakistani businessperson and politician, former Governor of Sindh
Sadia Dehlvi, Indian activist, writer, and columnist
Shamoon Sultan, Pakistani textile designer, textile businessperson, and founder of Khaadi

Some prominent businesses internationally 
• Dolphin Stationery • International Empire Traders • Ferozuddin Stationery ,Efroze pharmaceutical
(More To Be Added Soon)

Associations 
There are two main organizations initiated by the Punjabi Saudagaran community that are active in Karachi:

 The Jamiyat Punjabi Saudagaran-e-Delhi (Association of Punjabi traders of Delhi) was registered in Delhi in the year 1910, and is composed of a president, two vice-presidents, one honorary secretary and one joint secretary.
A monthly digest containing all the happenings in the community all around the world and efforts made for the nation by the community's prominent persons is published and issued under the title "Saudaagar". There is a book acknowledging the well-known figures in the community, such as Tipu Sultan, with the title of "Yaad-e-Raftgaan".
They also have a Jamiyat Punjabi Saudagaran-e-Dehli Maiyat Bus Service. They have their own graveyards for their Biradri known as "Yousuf Pura", "Shams Pura", "Bagh Nawab Uddin" and "Shafiq Pura" at Karachi.
They also provide a Ghusal e Maiyat Service.
The Jamiyat also gives monthly pension, houses, daily household things to widows, unmarried, orphans, and other poor people of their Biradri.

 The other one is ANJUMAN PUNJABI SAUDAGRAN Ibraheem state-building, which is also a community-based NGO providing financial assistance, health, education, residence, character building, event management, and grooming social activities for the people of Pakistan, the organization consist of one President, one Vice President, an Honorary General Secretary, a Joint Secretary, and one treasurer and a total 21 members of the board, They also publish a monthly Gazette with the name Anjuman Qaumi Gazette which is widely circulated to the members

Current position 

The independence in 1947 was a traumatic event, and a significant portion of this community had to leave India. After the independence of Pakistan, a large number of these traders migrated to Lahore and Karachi. A few numbers of these traders migrated to Mecca and Medina and are usually referred to by the surname, “Aldehlawi”. Some still continue to live in Delhi.

See also 

 Khatris
 Punjabi Muslims
 Punjabi Shaikhs
 Shamsuddin Sabzwari

References 

Punjabi tribes
Muslim communities of India
Social groups of Pakistan
Social groups of India
Social groups of Delhi
Social groups of Uttar Pradesh
Muslim communities of Uttar Pradesh